Léon-Arthur Elchinger (2 July 1908, in Soufflenheim – 30 June 1998, in Strasbourg) was the Bishop of Strasbourg from 1967 to 1984.

Diploma 
 Ph.D in Theology and in Scholasticism philosophia
 Bachelor of Arts

Career in the Order
 1931: Ordained Catholic priest in April, then nominated professor and director at the theological seminary in Strasbourg
 1938: Military chaplain in Strasbourg
 1941: Nominated Senior of the theological seminary of Strasbourg; withdrawn back to Clermont-Ferrand during World War II
 1945: Nominated Diocesan director of the catholic pedagogy of Strasbourg
 1947: Nominated Canon of the Strasbourg Cathedral 
 1958: Nominated ancillary Bishop and coadjutor Mgr Weber
 1962–1965: Participated in the Second Vatican Council; made a notable intercession on behalf of the rehabilitation of Galileo Galilei
 1967: Nominated Bishop of Strasbourg
 1984: Resigned as Bishop of Strasbourg, being replaced by Msgr. Charles-Amarin Brand
 1984–1998: Very active during his retirement, he wrote several books and appeared often in the news media. He died two days before his 90th birthday.

Bibliography 
By Léon-Arthur Elchinger :
 Urgence du vrai, Cri d'un évêque - Mame, collection Religion 
 Je plaide pour l'homme - Fayard, collection Religion 
 Liberté d'un Evêque - Centurion
 David contre Goliath aujourd'hui - Fayard, collection Christianime 
 Risquer la vérité, les racines de l'avenir - Fayard, collection Christianime 
 L'âme de l'Alsace et son avenir - La Nuée Bleue 
 Paroles pour la France - Salvator

Controversy
In April 1981, Elchinger remarked at a press conference, "I consider homosexuality a sickness." This prompted the concentration camp deportee, Pierre Seel, to write an open letter to the Bishop on 18 November, and to speak publicly for the first time about his experiences and wartime abuses he had faced as a homosexual.

See also
Archbishops of Strasbourg

External links   
   Mgr Elchinger by Yeshoua RASH  1979
  Mgr ELCHINGER by the Grand Rabbi René GUTMAN, 1998

1908 births
1998 deaths
People from Bas-Rhin
People from Alsace-Lorraine
Bishops of Strasbourg
Participants in the Second Vatican Council
20th-century Roman Catholic bishops in France